The 12th Army was a field army-level command of the Austro-Hungarian Army that existed only for one month during World War I, led by Archduke Karl Franz Joseph. It had been formed in response to the success of the Russian Empire's Brusilov Offensive, and was dissolved upon the formation of Army Group Archduke Karl.

History 
The Austro-Hungarian 12th Army was formed on the Eastern Front on 4 July 1916, and its commander was Archduke Karl Franz Joseph, the future Emperor of Austria. The 12th Army was again disbanded on 13 August 1916, around the time when the Archduke became commander of the Army Group Archduke Karl, fighting against the Russian Empire and Romania.

Commanders

Chiefs of staff

References 

Field armies of Austria-Hungary
1916 establishments in Austria-Hungary
Military units and formations established in 1916
Military units and formations disestablished in 1916